The Jabalpur–Bhusaval section is a railway line connecting Jabalpur, Madhya Pradesh and , Maharashtra. This  track is part of the Howrah–Allahabad–Mumbai line, one of the busiest railways in India. The line is under the jurisdiction of West Central Railway and Central Railway.

History
In 1866 Bhusaval-Khandwa section was opened. The GIPR connection reached Jabalpur from Itarsi on 7 March 1870,  linking up with the East Indian Railway Company track there from Allahabad, and establishing connectivity between Mumbai and Kolkata.

Electrification
While the Itarsi–Harda sector was electrified in 1990–91, the Harda–Khandwa–Bhusaval sector was electrified the next year.

Speed limits

Passenger movement
Jabalpur (Station Code JBP) and Bhusaval (Station Code BSL)are amongst the top hundred booking stations of Indian Railway.

Loco sheds
Itarsi diesel shed holds 145+ locos. It has WDM-2, WDM-3A, WDM-3D, WDS-6 and WDP-4 diesel locos. This shed serves routes all across central India. Itarsi electric loco shed came up in the 1980s. It holds WAM-4, WAP-4 and WAG-5 electric locos. Its WAG-5 locos perform banking duties on the Budni–Barkhera ghat section. Bhusaval electric loco shed has WAM-4, WAP-4, WAG-5, WAG-7 and WCM-6 locomotives.

References

External links
 Trains at Jabalpur
 Trains/42 at Gadarwara
 Trains at Itarsi
 Trains at Khandwa
 Trains at Bhusaval

5 ft 6 in gauge railways in India
Rail transport in Maharashtra
Rail transport in Madhya Pradesh
Railway lines opened in 1870

Transport in Bhusawal
Transport in Jabalpur